Stylophorum lasiocarpum, the Chinese celandine poppy, is a species of flowering plant in the family Papaveraceae, native to central China. A biennial or short-lived perennial reaching , it is hardy to USDA zone 4, and is readily available from commercial suppliers. It produces a succession of yellow flowers from late spring to late summer, and its seed capsules explosively release their seeds when ripe.

References

Papaveroideae
Garden plants of Asia
Endemic flora of China
Flora of North-Central China
Flora of South-Central China
Plants described in 1909